Victoria River Downs may refer to

 Victoria River Downs Station, a pastoral lease that operates as a cattle station in the Northern Territory of Australia
 Victoria River Downs Airport, an airport that serves the station

See also
Victoria River (disambiguation)